Aleš Holubec (born 13 March 1984) is a Czech male volleyball player. He was part of the Czech Republic men's national volleyball team at the 2010 FIVB Volleyball Men's World Championship in Italy. He plays for Nantes Rezé Métropole.

References

External links
Profile at FIVB.org

1984 births
Living people
Czech men's volleyball players
Sportspeople from Opava
Czech expatriate sportspeople in France
Expatriate volleyball players in France